John William Francis Kiddey (5 July 1929 – 13 November 2021) was a New Zealand cricketer who played first-class cricket for Canterbury from 1957 to 1965.

Kiddey was a left-arm medium-pace bowler who bowled economically for Canterbury throughout his career, taking his wickets at an average of 20.17 and conceding only 1.69 runs per over. After the 1960–61 season, when he took his best figures of 7 for 24 and 3 for 35 against Northern Districts (match figures of 45–26–59–10) he was considered a possible selection for the tour of South Africa in 1961–62. When Canterbury dismissed Otago for 64 in 1963–64 he had figures of 8–5–8–5.

In a long career in the Christchurch senior competition he took 862 wickets for the Riccarton and St Albans clubs, including five or more wickets in an innings 52 times.

Kiddey died in Christchurch in November 2021, aged 92. He and his wife Betty were married for 70 years.

References

External links
 
 Jack Kiddey at CricketArchive

1929 births
2021 deaths
New Zealand cricketers
Canterbury cricketers
Cricketers from Christchurch